The State of the State Address is a speech customarily given once each year by the governors of each of the states of the United States, although the terminology for this speech differs for some states: in Iowa, the speech is called the Condition of the State Address; in Kentucky, Massachusetts, Pennsylvania, and Virginia it is called the State of the Commonwealth Address. The speech is customarily delivered before both houses of the state legislature sitting in joint session, with the exception of the Nebraska Legislature, which is a unicameral body.  The speech is given to satisfy a constitutional stipulation that a governor must report annually, or in older constitutions described as being "from time to time", on the state or condition of a state. 

The potentially unclear name reflects the dual meanings of the word "state"; the first refers to the general condition of a thing, and the second refers to the political conception of a state. 

The mayor of the District of Columbia gives a State of the District address. There are also many cities in the United States in which the mayor gives a State of the City address. Some American counties have county executives give a State of the County or Parish address, though these are much more rare.

The analogous address given by the president of the United States is known as the State of the Union address.

References

 Nuquist, Andrew E. and Edith W. Nuquist. Vermont State Government and Administration. Government Research Center, The University of Vermont: 1966. Library of Congress Card Number 65-29199.
 Tarr, G. Alan. Understanding State Constitutions. Princeton University Press: 2000. .
 Wolin, Sheldon. The Presence of the Past: Essays on the State and the Constitution. The Johns Hopkins University Press: 1990. .

External links

A Decade of State of the State Speeches - A year-by-year analysis of Stateline’s archive of State of the State speeches from all 50 states and links to speeches, from 2002 to 2011, organized by state.

Speeches by type